SS Camorta was a passenger steamship built at A. & J. Inglis in 1880 and owned by the British India Steam Navigation Company.

Camorta sank in the Irrawaddy Delta on 6 May 1902 with the loss of all 655 passengers and 82 crew. She was en route from Madras, India, to Rangoon, Burma, across the Bay of Bengal, when she was caught in a cyclone while she was crossing an area called the Baragua Flats, just off the Irrawaddy Delta. All of her passengers and 73 of her crew were Indians. She was reported missing when she failed to arrive at Rangoon on 13 May 1902. Other British India vessels were sent to search for her. Initially, a lifeboat was found near the Krishna lightvessel.

References 

Steamships of the United Kingdom
Maritime incidents in 1902
Shipwrecks in rivers
Ships of the British India Steam Navigation Company
1880 ships
Ships built in Glasgow
1902 in Asia
Ships lost with all hands